Chlorhoda tricolor is a moth of the subfamily Arctiinae first described by Hervé de Toulgoët in 1982. It is mainly found in Peru.

References

Arctiini